Ángel Luis Sánchez (born November 28, 1989) is a Dominican professional baseball pitcher in the San Diego Padres organization. He previously played in Major League Baseball (MLB) for the Pittsburgh Pirates and the KBO League for the SK Wyverns.

Career

Los Angeles Dodgers
Sánchez signed with the Los Angeles Dodgers as an amateur free agent on December 1, 2010. He made his professional debut with the Single-A Great Lakes Loons in the Midwest League in 2011, where he was 8–4 in 20 games (16 starts) with a 2.82 ERA. He was promoted to the High-A Rancho Cucamonga Quakes in 2012 where he struggled a bit, going 6–12 with a 6.58 ERA in 27 games (23 starts). Sánchez returned to Great Lakes to start 2013 where he was 2–7 with a 4.88 ERA in 14 starts before he was returned to Rancho Cucamonga.

Miami Marlins
On July 6, 2013, he was traded to the Miami Marlins (along with Josh Wall and Steve Ames) in exchange for Ricky Nolasco. He finished the year with the High-A Jupiter Hammerheads, going 4-3 with a 3.22 ERA in 10 appearances. He was added to the Marlins 40-man roster on November 20, 2013. He was assigned to the Double-A Jacksonville Suns to begin the 2014 season.

Tampa Bay Rays
On June 13, 2014, Sánchez was claimed off waivers by the Tampa Bay Rays and optioned to the Double-A Montgomery Biscuits. He was designated for assignment on June 30 after struggling to an 8.00 ERA in 2 games for Montgomery.

Chicago White Sox
On July 2, 2014, Sánchez was claimed off waivers by the Chicago White Sox and assigned to the High-A Winston-Salem Dash. In 2 games for Winston-Salem, Sánchez logged a 4.26 ERA and 1-1 record, and also recorded a 1-2 record and 6.60 ERA in 3 games for the Double-A Birmingham Barons.

Pittsburgh Pirates
On July 31, 2014, Sánchez was claimed off waivers by the Pittsburgh Pirates and optioned to the Double-A Altoona Curve. In 6 games for Altoona, he pitched to a 4.32 ERA with 21 strikeouts. On December 8, 2014, Sánchez was outrighted off of the 40-man roster following the waiver claim of Josh Lindblom. He split the 2015 season between Altoona and the Triple-A Indianapolis Indians, pitching to a cumulative 13-2 record and 2.69 ERA between the two teams. On September 5, 2015, it was announced that Sánchez would undergo Tommy John surgery and miss the 2016 season as a result. He was released on March 14, 2016, and quickly re-signed to a minor league contract the next day. In 2017, Sánchez was assigned to Indianapolis to begin the 2017 season, where he pitched to a 3-5 record and 3.74 ERA in 39 appearances.

Sánchez was selected to the 40-man roster and called up to the majors for the first time on August 23, 2017. In his debut, he pitched 2.0 innings of 2-run ball against the Los Angeles Dodgers. He finished his rookie season with a 1-0 record and 8.76 ERA in 8 games for the Pirates. On November 27, Sánchez was released by the organization to pursue an opportunity in Japan.

SK Wyverns
On November 27, 2017, Sánchez signed a one-year, $1.1 million contract with the SK Wyverns of the KBO League. In 2018, Sánchez pitched to an 8-8 record and 4.89 ERA with 124 strikeouts in 145.1 innings of work. Sánchez won the Korean Series with the club in 2018. The next year, he pitched in 28 games for the Wyverns, logging a stellar 17-5 record and 2.62 ERA with 148 strikeouts in 165.0 innings pitched. He became a free agent following the 2019 season.

Yomiuri Giants
On December 6, 2019, Sánchez signed a multi-year contract with the Yomiuri Giants of Nippon Professional Baseball. In 2020, he pitched in 15 games for Yomiuri, posting an 8-4 record and 3.08 ERA with 59 strikeouts. He became a free agent after the 2021 season.

San Diego Padres
After taking the 2022 season off, on January 16, 2023, Sanchez signed a minor league contract with the San Diego Padres organization.

References

External links

 Career statistics - NPB.jp

1989 births
Living people
Altoona Curve players
Baseball players at the 2020 Summer Olympics
Medalists at the 2020 Summer Olympics
Olympic medalists in baseball
Olympic bronze medalists for the Dominican Republic
Birmingham Barons players
Dominican Republic expatriate baseball players in Japan
Dominican Republic expatriate baseball players in South Korea
Dominican Republic expatriate baseball players in the United States
Great Lakes Loons players
Indianapolis Indians players
Jacksonville Suns players
Jupiter Hammerheads players
KBO League pitchers
Major League Baseball pitchers
Major League Baseball players from the Dominican Republic
Montgomery Biscuits players
Nippon Professional Baseball pitchers
Pittsburgh Pirates players
Rancho Cucamonga Quakes players
Scottsdale Scorpions players
SSG Landers players
Winston-Salem Dash players
Yomiuri Giants players
People from Hermanas Mirabal Province
Olympic baseball players of the Dominican Republic